In sociology, role homogeneity is the degree of overlap amongst the different roles performed by different members of a community.

Rural sociology
Rural sociologists often note that amongst rural communities there exists a very high degree of role homogeneity, that is, one person may perform the duties of banker, coach, deacon, school board member, and neighbor.

Controversy
Sociologists have demonstrated that in areas of strong homogeneity, there is a general tendency to repress controversy. As a result, when disagreements arise, they can result in serious crises. Such communities tend to have local newspapers which are more oriented towards marketing, rather than news. What news is published, in a highly-homogeneous society, tends to focus on non-controversial topics and avoid "bad news".

See also
 dramaturgy
 rural sociology
 sociology

References

Sociological terminology